In My Skin may refer to:

In My Skin (film), 2002
In My Skin (TV series), 2018
"In My Skin", song by Aurora from "The Day It Rained Forever"